Dicheros is a genus of beetles belonging to the family Scarabaeidae, subfamily Cetoniinae.

Cladogram

References
 Catalogue of Life

Cetoniinae